Falmouth was launched in 1806 at Liverpool as a slave ship. After the British slave trade ended in 1807, she became a West Indiaman until a privateer captured her in 1812.

Slave ship
Falmouth first appeared in Lloyd's Register (LR) in 1806 with Sherwood, master, Lett & Co., owners, and trade Liverpool–Africa. Captain William Sherwood acquired a letter of marque on 5 June 1806.

Captain William Sherwood sailed from Liverpool on 28 June 1806. Falmouth acquired her slaves at Bonny Island. She arrived at Montego Bay on 14 January 1807. There she landed 395 slaves. She left on 22 April and arrived back at Liverpool on 14 June. She had left Liverpool with 63 crew members and she suffered three crew deaths on the voyage.

West Indiaman
LR for 1807 showed her master changing to R.Watson. LR for 1808 showed him sailing Falmouth between Liverpool and Jamaica. He sailed from Cork on 11 November 1807 as part of the Jamaica fleet. In 1812 her master changed from R. Watson to M. Hill. Her trade was still London–Jamaica.

Fate
Falmouth reached Portland, Maine in mid-September 1812. The American privateer Thomas had captured Falmouth as she was sailing from London to Jamaica. The Register of Shipping (RS) for 1813 showed her master as W.Hill, her owners as Litt & Co., and her trade as Liverpool–West Indies. The entry carries the notation "Captured".

LR continued to carry Falmouth, Hill, master, Jerwarris, owner, for a number of years. However the ship arrivals and departures data in Lloyd's List had no mention of a "Falmouth, Hill".

Citations

1806 ships
Liverpool slave ships
Age of Sail merchant ships of England
Captured ships